Kandhamal district is a district in the state of Odisha, India. The district headquarters of the district is Phulbani. Kandhamal is famous for its local turmeric renowned as 'Kandhamal Haldi' which has earned the Geographical indication (GI) tag from Intellectual Property India, an organisation functioning under the auspices of the Ministry of Commerce and Industry (India). It is the district full with natural beauties includes wild animals and birds.

History
Kandhamal district was created on 1 January 1994 from the former Phulbani district as a result of district reorganization in the state of Odisha. It is a tribal-dominated district, where a majority of the people belong to the Kondh (Kandha) tribe.

Geography
The district lies between 83.30° E to 84-48° E longitude and 19-34° N to 20-54° latitude. The district headquarters is Phulbani, located in the central part of the district. The other popular locations are Baliguda, G. Udayagiri, Tikabali and Raikia.

The territory is rural, with a number of waterfalls, springs, hill stations, and historical and archaeological places.

 Area: 8,021 km²
 Altitude: 300 to 1100 meter
 Rainfall: 
 Climate: Minimum temperature (December) ; maximum temperature (May) 

A majority of the land area of the district (71%) is forests, and 12% of the land is cultivable. The road connectivity with other districts is poor. Kandhamal is one of the poorest districts in Orissa, ranking 29th out of 30 districts by the Human Development Index.

Demographics
According to the 2011 census Kandhamal district has a population of 733,110, roughly equal to the nation of Guyana or the US state of Alaska. This gives it a ranking of 497th in India (out of a total of 640). Its population growth rate over the decade 2001-2011 was 12.92%. Kandhamal has a sex ratio of 1037 females for every 1000 males, and a literacy rate of 65.12%.

At the time of the 2011 Census of India, 53.15% of the population in the district spoke Odia and 45.65% Kui as their first language.

A majority of the inhabitants belong to the Kondh tribe, following various religious faiths, who are said to be "proud and aggressive", in the words of a district official. The Kondhs hold 77% of the cultivable land. Khond Scheduled Tribes (including 21% Protestant Christian Khond tribals) make up the total of 53.6% of the population of the District.

Panos (the main Dalit community) hold less than 9% of the cultivable land. Officially Hindu, the Scheduled Castes, most of whom belong to Pano (Scheduled Caste) community, make up 15.8% of the population. However it is estimated that more than 10. 3% of the aforementioned 15.8% Panos in Kandhamal, while claiming to be Hindu in documents, covertly practise Catholicism in reality, and hence they are not even legally eligible for Scheduled Caste Status.  

The majority of Panos are "covert" Catholics and there have been intercinine conflicts between the Catholic Panos and Protestant/ Hindu Khonds in Kandhamal over land resources.

Agriculture 
Rice is the primary staple food and crop of Kandhamal district. In recent years residents have focused on horticulture, sericulture, floriculture and other agricultural activities apart from rice. The district is full of flora and fauna. A wide variety of wildflowers like orchids are found in the dense forests of the district. Mango, mahula (mahua), Indian gooseberry (amla), kendu, meswak and jackfruit are also found in abundance in the wilderness. Bamboo and Thysanolaena (broom grass) are collected from the forests of Kandhamal and used or sold. A special pulse known as kandula is native to this district; the Kondh people mostly cultivate it in the hilly forests. The organic turmeric cultivated in this district is popularly known as 'Kandhamal Haladi' and is renowned for its purity. An organization called Kasam promotes turmeric cultivation in the district. In some areas ginger is also cultivated along with turmeric.

Culture

Festivals
The people of Kandhamal celebrate many religious festivals from their tribal culture as well as many Odiya festivals.
The Danda Nach is celebrated in the district mainly by the Kondh tribals, following their traditional religion. They observe this for thirteen days in the Hindu month of Chaitra. People go fasting for all the thirteen days who viewed for the particular boon or for grace from the goddess Kaali. The festival starts on the first of April and closes on the thirteenth day. The closing ceremony is called Meru. Kondhas consume the first mango of the season, only after it has been offered to the goddess Kaali on the evening of Meru.

In the month of January, Kondhs perform worship rituals after harvesting in the villages as per their own convenience. This puja is called Sisaa Laka. In the month of March they perform puja to get blessings from Darni Penu (the village deity) and Saru Penu (a mountain deity) to collect the mahula flower and green mangoes as well as the forest products. After offering to the deity, they collect the product to use as food, etc.

In the month of April/May they offer the mohula flower in the form of cakes to the village deity; this is called Maranga Laka. On special occasions Kedu Laka is done depending on the requirement of the mother earth, which is decided by the village priest, locally called Kuta Gatanju. Kedu Laka is one of the main occasions among the Kandha tribes in Raikia block; they do Kedu Laka to eat mangoes of the village.

After the sowing of the crops, to appease the mother earth, puja is performed for good crops at the  village deity by the priest called Jakera. This Puja is called Bora Laka. This puja is done in the month of September/October. In the month of November/December new crops are collected; chuda and rice are prepared and made into khiri (rice pudding), which is offered to the village deity, and the villagers eat the new harvest.

The major Hindu festivals like Holi, Diwali, Rakshabandhan, Shivratri, Ram Navami and Janmashtami are celebrated by Kondhs and other Hindus in the district with equal fervor. The Hindu month of Kartik is considered sacred by tribal and other Hindu residents of the district; people observe fasting and stay away from non-vegetarian food and alcohol. Nowadays people celebrate the Savan (Shravan) month by offering their prayers to Shiva and carrying water to Shiv temples walking barefoot. During Rakshabandhan, village children organize a game called Gamhadiyan, where a small earthen pedestal is created and a string containing toffes is  hung over it. Children jump over the pedestal to pluck and win the goodies from the string.

Many of the Khond tribal people converted to Protestant Christianity in the late 19th century, and they celebrate Christmas and Easter as well. Some of the Kondhs follow Islam and Eid; Ramzan and Muharram are also celebrated.

The Catholic Panos celebrate Christmas and Easter while the Hindu Panos celebrate all Hindu festivals. There are several Panos who have converted from Catholicism and Hinduism to Buddhism, especially in Raikia and Balliguda, and they celebrate Buddha Jayanti religious festivals.

There are other small communities of Sikhs and Jains who also celebrate their religious festivals.

Places of interest

Balaskumpa is a village in this south-east of Kandhmal (Phulbani) Sub-Division situated 20-25’N and 84-21’ at the confluence of two hilly streams, which combine to form the Pilla Salki river.

Belghar is situated at a height of more than 2,000 feet (609.6 metres) above the sea level in Balliguda sub-division.
The area has a number of mountains, forest and wild animals, especially elephants. It has an Inspection Bungalow of Forest Department, which is built with wooden planks. It is lighted by solar power.  Ushabali valley is near the village. Sometimes flocks of peacocks or wild elephants are seen by the roadside.

Chakapad is situated about 800 ft (243.84 m) from sea level in G. Udayagiri Tahasil.  The historical Bhrutanga River originates here.

Another temple dedicated to Lord Anandeswar and Jogeswar (Siva) is located nearby; one big fair is held here on the Sivaratri day.  The place is situated in the midst of thick forest.

Daringbadi is situated at a height of about 3,000 ft (914.4 m) above sea level in Balliguda sub-division. It can be approached directly from Berhampur. The place is attractive in the summer season due to its low temperatures. Hill View point has been developed at Daringbadi, where visitors can view the valley. A tourist complex has been built at Daringibadi for accommodation of tourists. Coffee plantations attract visitors to Daringibadi all through the year.

Dungi is about 45 km from Phulbani, situated on Phulbani-Berhampur road in G. Udayagiri Tehsil.  This is the only archaeological site in Kandhamal district.  There was one Buddha Vihar of the 11th century; since it was ruined, Siva temples have come up on the site, excavated during construction of new temples, and are kept in the temple premises.  One Buddha statue has been shifted from the nearby area to the Odisha State Museum, Bhubaneswar.

Jalespeta is a valley about 127 km from Phulbani, situated near Tumudibandh. It is the site of a Shiva temple located right between the hilly river rock bed. The banks of the tiny river surprisingly have white sand, which is very rare for this place. This part of the state usually doesn't have such clear white sand, which is common in coastal region river banks and sea shores.

Kalinga Valley (Kalinga Ghaats) is located 48 km away from Phulbani, the district headquarters on the Phulbani – Berhampur National Highway. The valley is famous for silviculture garden and medicinal plant cultivation. The silviculture garden has rubber trees and human-thick bamboo plants.

It is situated in dense forest inhabited by wild elephants. One fair-weather road leads to the side via Subarngiri. There is a 100-foot (30.5 m) high waterfall.

Mandasaru Kuti is located about 100 km from Phulbani in the Raikia Block. There is an old church on the outskirts of the village, surrounded by mountains. There is a mountain gorge nearby. Lodging options available.

Pakadajhar is about 30 km from Phulbani town near the village Sudrukumpa, situated on Phulbani-Boudh road in Phulbani Tahasil.  The Pakdajhar waterfall is 60 feet high, and is nestled  in the natural forest. There is a single road leading to the site from Sudrukumpa. With recent development of the destinations, a lot of tourists visit the place for picnics from early November to the end of February.

Putudi is 18 km from Phulbani town with a waterfall of  height, situated in the dense forest. One good road leads to the site.  The waterfall is on the river Salunki.

Rushimal is situated about 50 km from Daringibadi, near the village Tamangi in Hattimunda G. P. A group of hills known as Rushimal hills are the origin of the river Rushikulya.  At the source there is a small reservoir known as “Rushikunda”, and above the hilltop a cave known as Rushigumpha.

Urmagada is 17 km from Phulbani town on Phulbani-Gochhapada road in Phulbani Tahasil.  The waterfall is 50 feet high, situated in a dense forest.  One fair-weather road leads to the site.

Kotagarh is located in Kandhamal district about 120 km from Phulabani and 54 km from Baliguda. In the Kotagarh block there is a 375 m waterfall. Maa Bhabani Temple is in Keshragu, 2 km from Kotagarh (Bighna). Kotagarh also has a wildlife sanctuary with elephants, tigers, nilgai, wild boar, chital and antelopes. Along with a variety of reptiles and mammals, the sanctuary has an aviary as well. The aviary has red jungle fowl, peafowl, peacocks and a wide variety of wild birds.

Kuruduawaterfall is situated at the village of Ladimaha in Kotagada block about 160 km from the district headquarter Phulbani. It is surrounded with dense bamboo forest.

Transport
The nearest airport is at Bhubaneswar . There is an airstrip at Gudari 5 km from Phulbani town for landing small planes and helicopters.

The nearest railway station is Rairakhol, on the Sambalpur – Bhubaneshwar line, which is 99 km from Phulbani. However, Berhampur ( from Phulbani) is another convenient rail link.

By road, Kandhamal can be approached from Sambalpur via Boudh (170 km, 106 miles) and Berhampur (165 km) as well as from Bhubaneshwar via Nayagarh (210 km, 130 miles).

While there are no dedicated tourist buses to the places of interest in the district, taxis may be hired at Phulbani or Balliguda. There is no railway route in the district.

Health facilities
There are fourteen hospitals:
 District Headquarters Hospital, Phulbani
 Sub Divisional Hospital, Balliguda
 Community Health Centre, Subarnagiri
 Community Health Centre, Tumudibandha
 Community Health Centre, Barakhama
 Community Health Centre, Daringbadi
 Community Health Centre, K.Nuagaon
 Community Health Centre, Raikia
 Community Health Centre, G.Udayagiri
 Community Health Centre, Brahamanpad
 Community Health Centre, Tikabali
 Community Health Centre, Gumagarh
 Community Health Centre, Phiringia
 Community Health Centre, Khajuripada

Politics

Lok Sabha constituencies

Vidhan sabha constituencies

The following are the 3 Vidhan sabha constituencies of Kandhamal district and the elected members of that area.

Communal unrest and insurgency

On 25 December 2007, ethnic conflict broke out between Khond tribals and Pano Scheduled Caste people in Kandhamals.

On 23 August 2008, Swami Lakshmanananda Saraswati - a leader of the Vishwa Hindu Parishad - was murdered along with four others, including a boy by a team of Maoist gunmen which allegedly included Catholic Panos. 
Maoist rebels took responsibility for the multiple murders. This led to large-scale riots between the indigenous ethnic Kandha tribe and the Scheduled Caste Pano communities. The underlying causes are complex and cross political and religious boundaries. Land encroachment, perceived or otherwise, was the main source of tension between the Khond and Pano communities. It was widely believed by the Khonds that Panos were purchasing tribal land by forged documents wherein they were shown to be Khonds. The clash was predominantly ethnic, as both Hindu Kondhs and Protestant Christian Kondhs were on the same side, fighting against Catholic Panos. 

Later the conflict assumed communal overtones, as it was projected by western media to be a persecution of "Christian Minorities" rather than an ethnic conflict for land resources. 

In April 2010, a special "fast track" court in Phulbani convicted 105 people.  Ten people were acquitted due to lack of evidence.

It is currently a part of the Red Corridor of India, an area with significant Maoist insurgency activity. Suspected Maoist rebels detonated a roadside land mine on 27 November 2010, blowing up an ambulance.  A patient, a paramedic, and the vehicle's driver were killed.

References

 Sources

External links

 
 Preliminary Findings & Recommendations - The National People’s Tribunal on Kandhamal, available at South Asia Citizens Web, 29 August 2010.
 From Kandhamal to Karavali: The Ugly Face of the Sangh Parivar, available at South Asia Citizen's Web, March 2009.

 
States and territories established in 1993
1993 establishments in Orissa
Districts of Odisha